Machine Love is an album by American industrial rock band Genitorturers, consisting mainly of new mixes of songs from the previous album, Sin City.

Track listing
  "Stitch in Time" (Dave Ogilvie & Scott Humphrey mix) 3:37
  "Touch Myself" (Dave Ogilvie & Scott Humphrey mix) – 3:21
  "Machine Love" (Evil D & Sketchy mix) – 3:58
  "Sin City" (KMFDM remix) – 4:32
  "One Who Feeds" (Dave Ogilvie remix) – 4:55
  "4 Walls Black" (Razed In Black remix) – 4:02
  "Asphyxiate" (Interface remix) – 6:14
  "Procession" (Dave Ogilvie mix) – 4:12

Personnel 
 Gen - vocals
 Evil D - bass
 Chains - guitar
 Racci Shay - drums

2000 remix albums
Genitorturers remix albums
Cleopatra Records remix albums